Alexandru Ioan Odobescu (23 June 1834 – 10 November 1895) was a Romanian author, archaeologist and politician.

Biography

He was born in Bucharest, the second child of General Ioan Odobescu and his wife Ecaterina. After attending Saint Sava College and, from 1850, a Paris lycée, he took the baccalauréat in 1853 and studied literature and archaeology at the University of Paris, graduating two years later. In 1858, he married Pavel Kiselyov's daughter Alexandra (Saşa) Prejbeanu; they had one daughter, Ioana. He was often apart from his wife and had affairs with other women.

Odobescu served as cabinet minister for religion and education in 1863, as head clerk at the Ministry of Foreign Affairs in 1865, and as prosecutor at the Court of Appeal. In 1870, he travelled in Switzerland and Italy, in connection with his discovery and description of the Pietroasele treasure, a collection of objects made from precious metals, of Gothic origin, found on Romanian territory; he also travelled to several other countries, including Denmark, Russia and Turkey. He opposed the tendency toward artificially Latinizing the literary Romanian language. He was elected to the Romanian Academy in 1870 and was professor of archaeology at the University of Bucharest from 1874, the year he was named chairman of the National Theatre Bucharest. He served as secretary of the Romanian legation at Paris in 1882, was principal of a teacher-training institute in Bucharest, and principal of the National Educational Institute in 1892. Poor, sick with gout, separated from his wife and daughter, around 1891, he fell passionately in love with Hortensia Racoviţă, a geography professor thirty years his junior. She rejected a marriage proposal made by Odobescu's wife, and he committed suicide by morphine overdose in Bucharest in 1895.

Selected works
Mihnea-Vodă cel rău, 1857
Doamna Chiajna, 1860
Câteva ore la Snagov, 1862
Pseudo-cynegeticos, sau fals tratat de vânătoare, 1875
Le Trésor de Petrossa, 1889
Pagini regăsite
Note de călătorie

Other writings include short stories, several dozen scholarly articles, an anthology of folk tales (among them 1875's "Jupân Rănică Vulpoiul" and "Tigrul păcălit") and one of folk poetry, and a History of Archaeology (1877). He also translated both literary and scholarly works.

Further reading
Curticăpean, Doina, Odobescu, sau lectura formelor simbolice, Bucharest: Editura Minerva, 1982.
Manolescu, Nicolae, Introducere în opera lui Alexandru Odobescu, Bucharest: Editura Minerva, 1976.
Păcurariu, Dumitru, A. I. Odobescu, Bucharest: ESPLA, 1966.
Pandele, Rodica, editor, Alexandru Odobescu: Antologie critică, Bucharest: Eminescu, 1976.

Notes

References
Chevalier, Tracy, Encyclopedia of the Essay, p. 613, New York: Taylor & Francis, 1997, .

External links

1834 births
1895 deaths
Titular members of the Romanian Academy
Archaeologists from Bucharest
Diplomats from Bucharest
Writers from Bucharest
Romanian essayists
Romanian folklorists
Romanian Ministers of Culture
Romanian Ministers of Education
19th-century Romanian novelists
Romanian male short story writers
Romanian short story writers
Romanian male novelists
Romanian writers in French
Chairpersons of the National Theatre Bucharest
Academic staff of the University of Bucharest
Drug-related suicides in Romania
Burials at Bellu Cemetery
Male essayists
19th-century short story writers
19th-century male writers
19th-century essayists
Romanian politicians who committed suicide
1890s suicides